Pierre Bataillon (born in 1810 in Saint-Cyr-les-Vignes) was a French clergyman and bishop for the Roman Catholic Diocese of Tonga. He was appointed bishop in 1842. He died in 1877.

References 

1810 births
1877 deaths
French Roman Catholic bishops
Roman Catholic bishops of Tonga